William Simpson (28 October 1823 – 17 August 1899) was a Scottish artist, war artist and war correspondent.

Life
Born into poverty in Glasgow, Simpson went on to become one of the leading 'special artists' of his day, and sketched many scenes of war for the Illustrated London News. His early years were very difficult living in a house with an abusive and alcoholic father, and in 1834 he was sent to live with his grandmother in Perth. 
Simpson's only formal schooling took place during this period and within a few years, he was working as an apprentice in the Glasgow lithographic firm of Macfarlane.
The artist stated later that "this was the turning point which changed all my boyish intentions."
It was during the years in Glasgow that he attended the Andersonian University and the Mechanics Institute in the evenings.

After the outbreak of the Crimean War in 1854, he was given the task of creating an image of the Alma based on various accounts so that it could be lithographed by another London publisher, Lloyd's. He also put sketches sent from the Baltic onto stone for the firm of Colnaghi. 
In anticipation of the fall of Sebastopol, Lloyd's had him prepare an image of the fall of the town so that it could be published immediately upon news of its actual capture. This presented a challenge to Simpson as he had little information about Sebastopol. 
He occasionally spoke with Mr. Day of Day and Son about the need to have sketches drawn at the front. 
Shortly thereafter, Colnaghi's contacted Simpson and invited him to go out to the Crimea and make sketches for the company.

Crimean War

Simpson arrived off the Crimean peninsula on 15 November 1854 and could hear distant firing. While he had missed the early battles, he was able to record the events before Sebastopol. He made numerous acquaintances who helped him with details for his pictures, but he was also struck by the plight of the common soldiers, "miserable looking beings...covered with mud, dirt, and rags," he wrote. 
He socialised with many officers, including Lord Raglan and Captain Peel; he also met Roger Fenton who took his photograph. 
In May 1855, Simpson accompanied Raglan on the expedition to Kertch which was captured on the 24th, but was back in time to observe the first attack on Sebastopol in June. On the night of the 17th, he crawled out of a trench to view the attack. He wrote, "It was a wild orchestra of sound, never to be forgotten." 
He was still at the front when the city finally surrendered, and he quit the Crimea in the autumn of 1855.

Throughout his time at the front, he would send back his water-colors to London where the lithographers of Day & Son would transfer them to stone. 
Simpson was paid 20 pounds for each picture. For the color, a separate stone was used for each tone. Colnaghis exhibited some of the water-colors including a show at the Graphic Society in February 1855. The first advertisements for the lithographs appeared in May 1855 and in the following month, a second series was announced. 

In all, the Colnaghis produced two large portfolios containing over eighty lithographs entitled The Seat of the War in the East. 
Two thousand copies of the complete set were produced. Simpson dedicated the series to Queen Victoria whose patronage he enjoyed for the rest of his life, and he was a frequent visitor to Windsor Castle and Balmoral. 
So popular were his pictures that he became affectionately known at 'Crimean Simpson'. 
There was a plan for the water-colors to be purchased for the nation but this came to nothing and they were sold-off by the Colnaghi's.

India and Abyssinia

In the late 1850s he was sent to India to sketch scenes relating to the recent Sepoy Revolt. 
The idea was to produce an illustrated publication similar to the Crimean portfolio, and Simpson had discussed the possibility with Mr. Day. 
The artist arrived at Calcutta on 29 October 1859, and traveled in Punjab, Sutlej, Bengal, Lucknow and Cawnpore, central India, the Himalayas, Kashmir and Madras. 
In February, 1862, he left Bombay and arrived in London only to find that Day and Son could not afford to produce a portfolio. 
Nevertheless, a large volume of colored lithographs was published under the title India Ancient and Modern. 
He was commissioned by Day & Son to visit these parts of India and record the places affected by the momentous events of the 'Mutiny' of 1857. Before leaving, he spent 'a considerable time in the library of India House, then in Leadenhall Street, looking over books about India, such as Daniels', to see what had been already done, and to get hints as to places I ought to visit'. 
The set of lithographs produced, based on his watercolours, was intended to rival David Roberts' Holy Land in scope. 
However, the project never came to fruition. 
This was caused by the financial collapse of Day & Son, due to the rise of wood engraving. 
By 1866, Simpson had delivered 250 watercolours to Day & Son and these were subsequently sold off as bankrupt stock.
Only 50 had been prepared as chromolithographs, and were published in 1867 as India ancient and modern. 
A series of illustrations of the country and people of India and adjacent territories.
For Simpson this was little consolation: 'So the great work on India, on which I had bestowed so much time and labour, never came into existence...'

In 1866, Simpson was contacted by the Illustrated London News to do some sketches of the Prince of Wales, on a visit to the Duke of Sutherland at Dunrobin Castle. 
Afterwards, the paper asked him to go to St. Petersburg and cover the Prince of Wales's attendance at the marriage of the Czarevich, afterward Emperor Alexander III.

Two years later, Simpson was in Abyssinia covering the campaign that had broken out. 
Initially, the paper used sketches supplied by one of the soldiers on campaign, Colonel Baigrie, but as his pictures were most landscapes, the paper felt that Simpson could add more life to the accounts of the war. 
The artist arrived at Suez on 18 June 1868, but by the time he neared the front, news came that Magdala had fallen to the Anglo-Indian force. 
Nonetheless, he was able to observe the retreat of the Abyssinian army, and the remains of the royal quarters of Emperor Theodore at Magdala. 
He arrived back at Dover on 2 July 1868 and the Illustrated London News published a special folio volume on the Abyssinian Campaign containing many of Simpson's and Baigrie's drawings.

Franco-Prussian War and The Commune

In 1870, he went to France to sketch the war with Prussia. On 25 July 1870, Simpson headed for the front by going from Nancy to Metz. In Metz, several journalists had already been arrested on suspicion of spying, and Simpson had to be very careful while making his sketches. He had to be creative in getting his sketches to London, and began using cigarette papers. 
As he said: "One could do a great deal on a book of that kind, and in the event of being apprehended, could make a cigarette of the sketch and smoke it before the eyes of one's accusers." In early August, he observed the arrival of the wounded after the battle of Forbach. 
Later while sketching a coach, he was surrounded by soldier and arrested on suspicion of being a spy but he finally convinced the French authorities that he was a 'special artist'. 
At the police station, his sketches were carefully examined, and he was finally released. 
Upon news of the surrender at Sedan, Simpson traveled to sketch the battlefield from the windows of a nearby chateau. 
In November 1870, he returned to London but was back in France in April 1871 to observe the events around Paris, where he was once again suspected of spying but was allowed to go free. 
On 27 April, he visited Paris and spent four weeks there, sketching the fortifications and the events of the Commune.
He was back in London by 11 June 1871.

In 1872 in Beijing he sketched the Chinese Emperor's wedding festivities. In 1873, during a trip around the world, Simpson happened to be in San Francisco when, on 11 April, Captain Jack and his Modoc followers murdered Brigadier-General Edward Canby and Methodist minister Eleazar Thomas at a peace parley.
Accordingly, Simpson immediately interrupted his world tour and journeyed up to Tule Lake and the lava beds at the California/Oregon border to make sketches of the Modoc Indian War. His sketch of the Canby/Thomas assassination scene is, today, the signature graphic representation of the 1873 Modoc War.

In 1874, he was elected an Associate of the (soon to be Royal) Institute of Painters in Water Colours. 
In 1875, he accompanied the Prince of Wales to India, and in 1877, visited Athens, Mycenae and Troy, with the excavations of Schliemann.

Afghan War

On 15 October 1878, Simpson left London en route to Afghanistan to provide illustrations of the Afghan war that had broken out. Traveling via Lahore and Peshawar, he passed through the Khyber Pass and witnessed the 'first shot' fired at the Battle of Ali Masjid.

He became friendly with Sir Louis Cavagnari who encouraged Simpson with his explorations of ancient Buddhist stupas in and around the Jalalabad Valley. While the Peshawar Valley Field Force was encamped at Jalalabad and later Gandamak, Simpson was allowed to have some soldiers to help him excavate Ahin Posh Tope and several other sites. As he excavated the Ahin Posh stupa in February 1879, he cleared the base of the stupa and dug a tunnel to the center, where he discovered important relics and deposits, now in the British Museum. He also made drawing reconstitutions based on his findings. On one occasion, he was shot at by an Afghan but the bullet just missed.

At Gandamak, he met the photographer John Burke and his counterpart at The Graphic, Frederic Villiers, and after the departure of Archibald Forbes, Simpson took over the task of supplying the Daily News with accounts of the campaign. 
In May 1879, he observed the signing of a peace treaty at Gandamak which ended the war for the time being.
When it was decided to send a mission to Kabul, Simpson applied to go but was turned down. 
His primary interest in accompanying the mission was to visit the giant Buddhas at Bamyan, but had he gone to Kabul, he probably would have been killed liked the rest of the mission. 
It was this event which precipitated the second part of the war.

Simpson returned to London in the summer of 1879. 
Upon his arrival, he visited the offices of the Illustrated London News on the Strand and collected all his sketches and water-colors which he proceeded to mount in two large albums. 
He also presented several papers to various learned societies on such aspects as Buddhist prayer wheels, sculptured topes and ancient remains in the Jalalabad Valley. 
In the same year he was elected a full member of the Institute of Painters in Water Colours.

In 1884, Simpson returned to Afghanistan with General Sir Peter Lumsden as part of the Afghan Boundary Commission. It was his last major trip abroad. Having spent the winter on the Afghan border, he set off for London in February 1885. As a result, he narrowly missed the Panjdeh incident in March, in which several hundred Afghans were killed by the advancing Russian army. Simpson reached London, therefore, at a time of great interest in the Boundary Commission and feverish speculation about the possibility of war with Russia. He received invitations to visit Lord Granville, then the Foreign Secretary, as well as various members of the Royal Family.

Throughout the following decade, Simpson continued his travels on behalf of his newspaper covering such events as royal weddings and coronations. 
In 1890, he observed the opening of the Forth Bridge and caught a chill which was to have detrimental effects on his health.

Family and death
Simpson married late in life to Maria Eliza Burt herself a portrait painter, and had one daughter, Ann Penelope born in 1884, who eventually emigrated to Australia. 
He died at home in Willesden, North London, on 17 August 1899 aged 75, and was buried in Highgate Cemetery.

Besides his war pictures, he covered state events, coronations, funerals, and other ceremonies. 
He was particularly interested in India and sketched scenes of the Kashmir Maharajas. 
He was a noted ethnographer and antiquarian, and wrote extensively on ancient religions, customs, and ancient artifacts.
It is said that the Queen intervened to prevent him from going out to Italy in 1859, to cover the Austro-Sardinian War, for fear that he would get killed.

Works by (books)
Brackenbury, G. & Simpson, W (1855). The campaign in the Crimea: an historical sketch (London: P. and D. Colnaghi).
 Simpson, William (1867). India ancient and modern: a series of illustrations of the country and the people of India and adjacent territories; executed in chromo-lithography from drawings by William Simpson; with descriptive literature by John William Kaye. London: Day and Son.
 Simpson, William (1874). Meeting the Sun: a Journey all round the World through Egypt, China, Japan and California, including an account of the marriage ceremonies of the emperor of China. (London: Longmans, Green, Reader, and Dyer).
 Simpson, William (1876). Picturesque people: being groups from all quarters of the globe. London: W. M. Thompson.
 Simpson, William (1896). The Buddhist Praying Wheel (London: Macmillan).
 Simpson, William (1899). The Jonah Legend. (London: Grant Richards).
 Simpson, William (1899). Glasgow in the Forties (ed. A.H. Miller). Morison Brothers.
 Simpson, William (1902). The seat of war in the East, from eighty-one drawings made during the war in the Crimea (London, Day & Son etc.).
 Simpson, William (edited by G. Eyre-Todd, 1903). The Autobiography of William Simpson (London, T. F. Unwin).

Works by (selected articles)
 Simpson, William, 'A contribution to the History of Lithography', The Lithographer, 1854
 Simpson, William, 'The architecture of India', RIBA Trans. (Royal Institute of British Architects), May 1862, pp. 165–178.
 Simpson, William, 'Arkite Ceremonies in the Himalayas', Good Words, 1866, pp. 601–608.
 Simpson, William, 'Praying Machines', Good Words, 1867, pp. 845–850.
 Simpson, William, 'An artist's jottings in Abyssinia', Good Words, 1 October 1868, pp. 605–613.
 Simpson, William, 'Church architecture of Abyssinia', RIBA Trans, 1869, pp. 234–246.
 Simpson, William, 'The Royal Quarries', Palestine Exploration Fund, 1870, pp. 373–379.
 Simpson, William, 'Jerusalem', Society for Biblical Archaeology, 1872, pp. 310–327.
 Simpson, William, 'The architecture of China', RIBA Trans, 1873, pp. 33–50.
 Simpson, William, 'China's future place in Philology', Macmillan's Magazine. Nov. 1873, pp. 45–48.
 Simpson, William, 'Gangootree', Alpine Journal, May 1874, pp. 385–397.
 Simpson, William, 'Symbolism of Oriental Ornament', Royal Society of the Arts Journal, Vol. 22, 1874, pp. 488–494.
 Simpson, William, 'The Modoc Region', RGS Procs. Vol. XIX, 1874–75, pp. 292–302.
 Simpson, William, 'Ark-Shrines of Japan', Society for Biblical Archaeology, 1877, pp. 550–554.
 Simpson, William, 'Architecture in the Himalayas', RIBA Trans. (Royal Institute of British Architects), Jan. 1883, pp. 65–80.
 Simpson, William, 'In the trenches before Sebastopol', English Illustrated Magazine, December 1895.
 Simpson, William, 'Winter and Summer in the trenches of Sebastopol', English Illustrated Magazine, April 1896, pp. 33–42.

Exhibition catalogues
 Watercolour Drawings of India, Thibet & Cashmire, exhibition catalogue, 1867.
 Underground Jerusalem, exhibition catalogue 1872.
 Round the World, exhibition catalogue 1874.
 India "Special", exhibition catalogue, 1876
 Catalogue of Exhibition of War Sketches by the late William Simpson, R.I., R.B.A., F.R.G.S. at Graves' Galleries, 6, Pall Mall, S.W. 1900.

Notes

References
 Simpson, William. The Autobiography of William Simpson. Reprint Infodial Ltd, .
 Archer, Mildred. Visions of India : the sketchbooks of William Simpson 1859-62.Topsfield, Mass., Salem House, 1986.
 Glasgow in the 1840s: watercolours by William Simpson, 1823-1899. Glasgow: Glasgow Museums with assistance from Glasgow Art Gallery and Museums Association, 1998.
 Harrington, Peter. "The First True War Artist," MHQ: The Quarterly Journal of Military History, Vol. 9, No. 1, Autumn 1996, pp. 100–109.
 Harrington, Peter, 'Simpson's Crimean Sketchbooks', The War Correspondent, Vol. 19, No. 1, April 2001, pp. 10–12.
 Harrington, Peter, 'The Defence of Kars: Paintings by William Simpson and Thomas Jones Barker', Journal of the Society for Army Historical Research, Vol. LXIX, No. 277, Spring 1991, pp. 22–28.
 
 Harrington, Peter (ed). (2016) William Simpson's Afghanistan: Travels of a Special Artist and Antiquarian during the Second Afghan War, 1878-1879. Solihull, UK, Helion.
 Pankhurst, Richard (ed). (2002) Diary of a Journey to Abyssinia, 1868 with the expedition under Sir Robert Napier KCSI, The Diary and Observations of William Simpson of the Illustrated London News. Hollywood, CA, Tsehai.
 Salisbury, Robert (2020). William Simpson and the Crisis in Central Asia, 1884-5. 
 Mr. William Simpson of the Illustrated London News: Pioneer war artist 1823-1899. London: Fine Art Society, 1987

External links

Anne S. K. Brown Military Collection, Brown University Library sketch-books, water-colors, prints, Afghan war diary and album, 1878–79
First Readings 2008- The Places in Between Afghan diary (extracts) and watercolors (selection)
Lipscomb, Adrian. William Simpson (1823-1899) -- "Prince of Pictorial Correspondents".
William Simpson and Himalayan Architecture 
Simpson, William, 1823-1899, Hathi Trust Digital Library

1823 births
1899 deaths
19th-century Scottish painters
Scottish male painters
Scottish watercolourists
Fellows of the Royal Geographical Society
Artists from Glasgow
Burials at Highgate Cemetery
19th-century war artists
British war artists
Members of the Royal Institute of Painters in Water Colours
19th-century Scottish male artists